Pavilions is a grocery store banner used by Vons, a supermarket division of Albertsons in Southern California.  Although similar to Vons stores, Pavilions markets are more upscale and feature a larger selection of organic food, wine, and other specialty foods.

Introduced by Vons in 1985, they were the showpiece of their new image.
The stores also tend to be larger than the typical Vons store, because many of them contain full-service pharmacies, expanded service areas and specialty offerings as a standard feature.

The first location was opened in Garden Grove in October 1985 in a 55,000-square-foot former Zody's discount department store building. The new store included a seafood shop that sold live fish, a full-service butcher shop, bakery, tortilla shop, small pizza parlor, ice cream shop, delicatessen, florist, and pharmacy.

See also
 Safeway
 Vons

References

External links
 

Supermarkets of the United States
Companies based in Orange County, California
American companies established in 1985
Retail companies established in 1985
1985 establishments in California
Safeway Inc.
Supermarkets based in California